HD 150248 is a Sun-like star 87 light-years (26.6 parsecs) from the Sun.  HD 150248 is a G-type star and a near solar twin. HD 150248's photometric color is also very close to that of the Sun; however, it has a lower abundance of metals, and has an apparent visual magnitude of 7.02. At 6.2 billion years old, this star is 1.6 billion years older than the Sun and has passed the stable burning stage. HD 150248 is found on the border between the constellations Scorpius and Ara. 

To date, no solar twin with an exact match to that of the Sun has been found. However, there are some stars that come very close to being identical, and thus considered solar twins by the astronomical community. An exact solar twin would be a G2V star with a 5,778K temperature, be 4.6 billion years old, with solar metallicity, and a 0.1% solar luminosity variation. Stars with an age of 4.6 billion years, such as the Sun, are at the most stable state. Proper metallicity and size are also very important to low luminosity variation.

Comparison to the Sun

See also 
 List of nearest stars

References

150248
G-type main-sequence stars
Solar analogs
081746
Durchmusterung objects
Scorpius (constellation)